Without may refer to:

"Without" (The X-Files), an episode in the eighth season of The X-Files
 "without", an English preposition
 "Without", a film that premiered at the 2011 Slamdance Film Festival
 "Without", a song by Jack Savoretti from the album Between the Minds, 2007
 "Without", a song by Brett Kissel from the album What Is Life?, 2021